The forest swastika was a patch of larch trees covering  area of pine forest near Zernikow, Uckermark district, Brandenburg, in northeastern Germany, arranged with their light colors to look like a swastika.

History
Reports say the larches were planted in 1938. It is unclear how the trees came to be planted and arranged in such a fashion. It seems they were planted in commemoration of Adolf Hitler's birthday, either by local Hitler Youth members or by a warden.

For a few weeks every year in the autumn and in the spring, the colour of the larch leaves would change, contrasting with the deep green of the pine forest. The short duration of the effect, combined with the fact that the image could only be discerned from the air and the relative scarcity of privately owned airplanes in the area, meant that the swastika went largely unnoticed after the fall of Nazi Germany. During the subsequent communist period, Soviet authorities reportedly knew of its existence but made no effort to remove it. However, in 1992, the reunified German government ordered aerial surveys of all state-owned land. The photographs were examined by forestry students, who immediately noticed the design.

Removal
The Brandenburg state authorities, concerned about damage to the region's image and the possibility that the area would become a pilgrimage site for National Socialist supporters, attempted to destroy the design by removing 43 of the 100 larch trees in 1995. However, the figure remained discernible with the remaining 57 trees as well as some trees which had regrown, and in 2000 German tabloids published further aerial photographs showing the prominence of the swastika. By this time, ownership of around half the land on which the trees sat had been sold into private hands, but permission was gained to fell a further 25 trees on the government-owned area on December 1, 2000, and the image was largely obscured.

Similar incidents
In the late 1970s, American troops discovered a swastika along with the numbers "1933" planted in a similar style in Hesse. Who planted the trees is unknown.

Myths and legends abound about how and when the swastika came to be planted in Soviet territory.

A pine tree forest with the shape of the word "DVX" (Latin for duce) was planted in 1939 on Mount Giano (near Antrodoco, central Italy) to avoid landslides and is still in place.

See also
 Olympic oaks, arboreal relics of 1930s Germany
 List of individual trees

Bibliography

References

External links
 "Swastika made of living trees cut down in German forest" CNN, December 4, 2000, retrieved March 9, 2006
  "Berlin forest swastika to go but its image may remain" from the Daily Telegraph
  "Der Hakenkreuz-Wald bei Zernikow kam unter die Säge", Berliner Zeitung from December 5, 2000. Accessed through Internet Archive.
  "Das Kreuz im Wald", Die Zeit, August 12, 2004. URL last accessed March 14, 2006.

Geography of Brandenburg
Forests and woodlands of Germany
Swastika
Nazi propaganda